__NoTOC__
The 1974 Australian referendum was held on 18 May 1974. It contained four referendum questions.

The referendum was held in conjunction with the 1974 federal election.

Results in detail

Simultaneous Elections
This section is an excerpt from 1974 Australian referendum (Simultaneous Elections) § Results

Mode of Altering the Constitution
This section is an excerpt from 1974 Australian referendum (Mode of Altering the Constitution) § Results

Democratic Elections
This section is an excerpt from 1974 Australian referendum (Democratic Elections) § Results

Local Government Bodies
This section is an excerpt from 1974 Australian referendum (Local Government Bodies) § Results

See also
Referendums in Australia
Politics of Australia
History of Australia

References

Further reading
  
 .
 Australian Electoral Commission (2007) Referendum Dates and Results 1906 – Present AEC, Canberra.

1974 referendums
1974
Referendum
May 1974 events in Australia